Dizaj-e Olya (also Romanized as Dīzaj-e ‘Olyā, Dīzaj-e Olyā, and Dīzaj ‘Olya; also known as Dīzaj, Dīzaj-e Bālā, Dīzeh, and Dizj Olya) is a village in Mishab-e Shomali Rural District of the Central District of Marand County, East Azerbaijan province, Iran. At the 2006 National Census, its population was 1,752 in 535 households. The following census in 2011 counted 2,084 people in 593 households. The latest census in 2016 showed a population of 2,925 people in 884 households; it was the largest village in its rural district.

References 

Marand County

Populated places in East Azerbaijan Province

Populated places in Marand County